The Zorlu Energy Power Project is a wind farm located at Jhimpir in Thatta District of Sindh province in Pakistan, 120 kilometres north-east of Karachi. The project has been developed by Zorlu Energy Pakistan, a subsidiary of the Turkish firm Zorlu Enerji. The total cost of project is $143 million.

History
In the first phase 6 MW, five German-made gearless VENSYS 62 of Vensys wind turbines each capable of producing 1.2 MW were installed/connected with 11 kV HESCO network and started generation in April 2009.

In the second phase, 28 more wind turbines of 1.8 MW capacity each, supplied by Vestas of Denmark were installed to produce a total of 50.4 MW electricity. This increased the capacity of the project to 56.4 MW. The project was completed in March 2013.

In July 2013, Zorlu Enerji announced that its 56.4 MW Jhimpir wind power plant in Pakistan had started to sell power to the Pakistani national power distribution company after having passed all the required tests.

Currently the privately owned Turkish wind farm is selling the produced electricity to Pakistan at a rate of 12.1057 US cents per kilowatt hour of electricity.

Currently, 45 wind power projects of around 3200 MW capacity are under process in Pakistan.

See also

 List of power stations in Pakistan
 List of dams and reservoirs in Pakistan

References

External links 
 Zorlu Energy Pakistan

Wind farms in Pakistan
Pakistan–Turkey relations
2009 establishments in Pakistan